Neis Beach is a hamlet in the Canadian province of Saskatchewan. It is located at the south-east corner of Emma Lake.

See also 
List of communities in Saskatchewan

References 

Lakeland No. 521, Saskatchewan
Unincorporated communities in Saskatchewan
Division No. 15, Saskatchewan